The 1965 Icelandic Cup was the sixth edition of the National Football Cup.

It took place between 31 July 1965 and 31 October 1965, with the final played at Melavöllur in Reykjavik. The cup was important, as winners qualified for the UEFA Cup Winners' Cup (if a club won both the league and the cup, the defeated finalists would take their place in the Cup Winners' Cup). Teams from the Úrvalsdeild karla (1st division) did not enter until the quarter finals. In prior rounds, teams from the 2. Deild (2nd division), as well as reserve teams, played in one-legged matches. In case of a draw, the match was replayed.

For the first time in 5 years (since the creation of the tournament), KR Reykjavik were eliminated when they entered, in the quarter finals. Valur Reykjavik won the Cup, beating IA Akranes 5 - 3 in the final.

First round

Second round 
 Entrance of Breiðablik Kopavogur and Valur Reykjavik B.

Third round

Quarter finals 
 Entrance of 6 clubs from 1. Deild

Semi finals

Final 

 Valur Reykjavik won their first Icelandic Cup and qualified for the 1966–67 European Cup Winners' Cup.

See also 

 1965 Úrvalsdeild
 Icelandic Cup

External links 
 1965 Icelandic Cup results at the site of the Icelandic Football Federation 

Icelandic Men's Football Cup
Iceland
1965 in Iceland